Arturo Rogerio Dimayuga Luz (November 26, 1926 – May 26, 2021) was a Filipino visual artist. He was also a known printmaker, sculptor, designer and art administrator.

A founding member of the modern Neo-realist school in Philippine art, he received the Philippine National Artist Award, the country's highest accolade in the arts, in 1997.

Education
Luz attended the School of Fine Arts at the University of Santo Tomas in Manila. He also went abroad to study at the California College of Arts and Crafts in Oakland from 1947 to 1949, the Brooklyn Museum Art School in New York from 1949 to 1950, and the Académie de la Grande Chaumiere in Paris from 1950 to 1951.

Early career
While Luz was pursuing college, he began exhibiting his works. At the 1962 International Art Salon in Saigon, South Vietnam, Luz won first prize for his work. He also garnered an award from the California Art Association, and was a recipient of the Republic Cultural Heritage Award for Painting of the Philippine Republic in 1966. He was also recognized as the Outstanding Young Man In Art by The Manila Times.

Later career
Luz produced art pieces through a disciplined economy of means. His early drawings were described as "playful linear works" influenced by Paul Klee. His best masterpieces were minimalist, geometric abstracts, alluding to the modernist "virtues" of competence, order and elegance; and had been further described as evoking universal reality and mirrors an aspiration for an acme of true Asian modernity.

From 1976 to 1986, Luz served as the first director of the Metropolitan Museum of Manila and is a frequent participant of exhibits held at the museum. He owned the Luz Gallery, which according to the National Commission for Culture and the Arts "professionalized the art gallery as an institution".

Personal life
Arturo was married to Teresita Ojeda (February 16, 1930 – April 28, 2019), with whom he had 4 daughters, including the late singer Paola Luz, (February 11, 1964, – August 26, 1991) at age 27, and former actress and model Angela Luz. He has a granddaughter named Paulina Sotto, the daughter of Angela Luz.

Death
He died on May 26, 2021, at the age of 94.

Further reading
Reyes, Cid. Arturo Luz. Manila: Ayala Foundation and The Crucible Workshop, 1999.

See also
Arts of the Philippines

References

External links
Samito.net

1926 births
2021 deaths
Place of birth missing
Filipino designers
Filipino painters
Filipino printmakers
Filipino sculptors
National Artists of the Philippines
University of Santo Tomas alumni
Brooklyn Museum Art School alumni